Charles Mochan (8 June 1879 – after 1906) was a Scottish professional footballer who played as a full back. He played in England for Grimsby Town in the Football League and for Brighton & Hove Albion in the Southern League.

References

1879 births
Footballers from Glasgow
Scottish footballers
Association football fullbacks
Strathclyde F.C. players
Grimsby Town F.C. players
Brighton & Hove Albion F.C. players
Renton F.C. players
English Football League players
Southern Football League players
Year of death missing